The 1997 African Junior Athletics Championships was the third edition of the biennial, continental athletics tournament for African athletes aged 19 years or younger. It was held in Ibadan, Nigeria, from 21–23 August. A total of 43 events were contested, 22 by men and 21 by women.

Agnes Afiyo of Ghana, the winner of the women's javelin throw and the 200 metres bronze medallist, was determined to be male in 1999 following medical testing. It is not known whether the medals from this competition were reassigned as a result. But it will be remembered.

Medal table

Medal summary

Men

Women

References

Results
African Junior Championships 1997. World Junior Athletics History. Retrieved on 2013-10-13.

African Junior Athletics Championships
African U20 Championships
1997 in Nigerian sport
African Junior Athletics
Sport in Ibadan
International athletics competitions hosted by Nigeria
1997 in youth sport